is a video game project by Japanese developer Compile Heart. The project consists of multiple non-connected games which were developed as part of Compile Heart's branding for titles created by their newly established development team, and is directed by Masahiro Yamamato, with character designs by Kei Nanameda and music by Tenpei Sato. The first game developed as part of the project, was released on the PlayStation Vita on July 23, 2015.

Trillion: God of Destruction

Trillion: God of Destruction is the first game within the Makai Ichiban Kan line of games. It was released on July 23, 2015 in Japan, March 29, 2016 in North America, and April 1, 2016 in Europe.

MeiQ: Labyrinth of Death

 is the second game within the Makai Ichiban Kan line of games, announced for release on the PlayStation Vita. It is a dungeon crawl video game.

References

External links
Makai Ichiban Kan official site 
Makai Shin Trillion official site 
Death Under the Labyrinth official site 

Idea Factory franchises
PlayStation Vita games
Role-playing video games
Dungeon crawler video games
Compile Heart games